Norman McFarlane is a Canadian businessman and politician. He was the 64th Mayor of Saint John, New Brunswick, Canada. He was first elected on May 10, 2004, and sworn into office on Tuesday, May 25. He was defeated in the 2008 New Brunswick municipal elections by Ivan Court.

Born in Apohaqui, New Brunswick, McFarlane worked for Royal Insurance in Saint John from 1953 to 1993, retiring as Branch Manager. Following his retirement from Royal Insurance, he became a private insurance consultant for a number of years. In the 1999 election, he was elected as a Member of the Legislative Assembly for the provincial riding of Saint John Lancaster as a Progressive Conservative and shortly afterwards became the New Brunswick Minister of Labour. In 2000, he became minister for the new Department of Training and Employment Development, a portfolio which encompassed much of his old labour portfolio as well as some social welfare programs and community colleges.

McFarlane was defeated in the 2003 election and left the cabinet as a result.  McFarlane lost his seat to Liberal Abel LeBlanc.

McFarlane promptly returned to politics in 2004 when he was elected mayor of Saint John by defeating incumbent Shirley McAlary by a margin of over 25%.  Ironically, one of McAlary's key backers was Abel LeBlanc.

McFarlane faced severe and lasting criticism and allegations of corruption and incompetence for his role in granting Irving Oil tax concessions in 2005, concessions that have cost the City of Saint John approximately $75 million over ten years, with a potential total loss of over $180 million.

References
City of Saint John: Mayor McFarlane's Biography (accessed February 6, 2007)
Archive of McFarlane's bio as a member of the legislature

Businesspeople from Saint John, New Brunswick
Progressive Conservative Party of New Brunswick MLAs
Members of the Executive Council of New Brunswick
Living people
Mayors of Saint John, New Brunswick
21st-century Canadian politicians
Year of birth missing (living people)